Animelo Summer Live, abbreviated as , is the biggest annual anime songs music festival in Japan hosted by Dwango and Nippon Cultural Broadcasting. Animelo Summer Live has been held every summer since 2005.

Description
Animelo performers are singers and voice actors that specialize in singing anime or game theme songs; however, they also both present and perform new original and tokusatsu songs as well. The performers are not necessarily under the same record label. Animelo has a different theme song for each year, which is sung by all performers in the end of the concert.

More general artists who have performed anime songs have also performed, including Rina Aiuchi, m.o.v.e, AAA, Shoko Nakagawa, Kenji Ohtsuki, Gackt, and Momoiro Clover Z. Due to various copyrights and contracts, some performances belonging to certain record labels have sometimes not been included on the video distributed on DVDs and Blu-Rays. This factored into the lack of a video release for 2005.

Because all music is played live, performs often appear with their band or dancers. Performers who do not have a band appear with a selected "Anisama band."

Starting with Anisama Girl's Night in 2010, there have been many spinoff Animelo events.

The sponsors of the event have been Dwango, Nippon Cultural Broadcasting, Good Smile Company, and Bushiroad.

Main Event

Spin-Off Events

Performers
Note: Personal names are in order by last name first except in cases of band names.

Media

CD
Each CD contains a theme song that was used for that given year.

DVD/Blu-Ray

Animelo Summer Live 2006 -OUTRIDE- I (DVD)
Label: King Records
Release date: December 21, 2006
Animelo Summer Live 2006 -OUTRIDE- II (DVD)
Label: Victor Entertainment
Release date: December 21, 2006

※Hare Hare Yukai performance is not included in both DVD

Animelo Summer Live 2007 -GENERATION A- (DVD)
Label: Lantis
Release date: November 28, 2007

※Psychic Lover's Dekaranger performance is not included in DVD

DVD/Blu-ray
Animelo Summer Live 2008 -Challenge- 8.30 
Animelo Summer Live 2008 -Challenge- 8.31
Label: King Records
Release date: March 25, 2009

※Some performances are not included in the release:
Strike Witches - Watashi ni Dekiru Koto / Ishida Yoko
All Sound Horizon and The Idolmaster performances

DVD/Blu-ray
Animelo Summer Live 2009 RE:BRIDGE 8.22
Animelo Summer Live 2009 RE:BRIDGE 8.23
Label: King Records
Release date: February 24, 2010

※Shoko Nakagawa's performances are not included in the release.

DVD/Blu-ray
Animelo Summer Live 2010 -evolution- 8.28
Animelo Summer Live 2010 -evolution- 8.29
Label: King Records
Release date: April 20, 2011

DVD/Blu-ray 
Animelo Summer Live 2011 -rainbow- 8.27
※BREAKERZ's Everlasting Luv and Isao Sasaki's performances are not included in the release
Animelo Summer Live 2011 -rainbow- 8.28
※Kalafina's and T.M.Revolution's performances are not included in the release
Label: King Records
Release date: March 28, 2012

DVD/Blu-ray
Animelo Summer Live 2012 -infinity∞- 8.25
※Eir Aoi's, Haruna Lunas's and LiSA's performances are not included in the release
Animelo Summer Live 2012 -infinity∞- 8.26
※Miku Hatsune's performance is not included in the release
Label: King Records
Release date: March 27, 2013

DVD/Blu-ray
Animelo Summer Live 2013 -Flag Nine- 8.23

Animelo Summer Live 2013 -Flag Nine- 8.24

Animelo Summer Live 2013 -Flag Nine- 8.25
※Coda's performance is not included in the release

Label: King Records
Release date: March 26, 2014

Spinoff events
Merchandise through CDs and DVD/Blu-ray were released for the two spinoff events that were held. For the first event entitled Anisama Girl's Night, a CD was released on November 2, 2010. This CD (called Nettaiya Girls) contains the events theme song which Masami Okui provided the lyrics and composition for. The last spinoff event entitled Anisama Super Game Song Live 2012 also included a CD along with a DVD/Blu-ray. The CD is called New Game, and was released on June 13, 2012. Minami Kuribayashi, and Shikura Chiyomaru provided the lyrics and composition. On February 27, 2013 a DVD/Blu-Ray was released through 5pb. for the event.

Notes

References

External links

 "50,000 people in the world's largest two-day anime songs festival" 28 August 2011 (Japanese) retrieved 19:41 UTC 7 September 2011
 27 & 28 August 2011 concerts review dated 30 August 2011 (Japanese) retrieved 19:45 UTC 7 September 2011
 27 & 28 August 2011 concerts article dated 1 September 2011 (Spanish) retrieved 19:50 UTC 7 September 2011
 27 & 28 August 2011 concerts article dated 30 August 2011 (Japanese) retrieved 14:27 UTC 8 September 2011
 "Anime biz sings the praises of shows" Japan Times (English) retrieved 18:53 UTC 17 April 2016

Anime concerts
Summer festivals
Music festivals established in 2005
Music festivals in Japan
Tourist attractions in Saitama Prefecture
2005 establishments in Japan
Dwango (company)